Germany was represented by Katja Ebstein, with the song "Diese Welt", at the 1971 Eurovision Song Contest, which took place on 3 April in Dublin. Ebstein was chosen internally to be the German representative, and the song was selected at the German national final, Ein Lied für Dublin, held on 27 February. This was the second of Ebstein's three appearances for Germany at Eurovision and she became the second performer, after Margot Hielscher, to represent the country in successive years.

Before Eurovision

Ein Lied für Dublin
The final was held at the TV studios in Frankfurt, hosted by Günther Schramm. Ebstein performed six songs and the winner was chosen by a 10-member jury, who each awarded between 1 and 5 points to each song. After the second and the fourth song, short interval acts were performed by British dance troupe Pamela Devis Ballet. They presented choreographies to "In the Summertime" by Mungo Jerry and the Ramsey Lewis Trio's instrumental version of "The 'In' Crowd".

After the final performance, the Rosie Singers, who had served as background ensemble for the six performances, sang a medley of three previous Eurovision Song Contest winning entries:

"Alles und noch viel mehr" (German version of "All Kinds of Everything" by Dana, 1970)
"Boom Bang-a-Bang" (German version of the 1969 UK winning entry by Lulu
"La, la, la" (1968 winning entry by Massiel for Spain)

Blue screen technology was used for most of Katja Ebstein's performances. Only the winning entry "Diese Welt" was performed with the orchestra seen in the background.

At Eurovision 
On the night of the final Ebstein performed 5th in the running order, following Switzerland and preceding Spain. Like Ebstein's 1970 entry "Wunder gibt es immer wieder", "Diese Welt" had a more contemporary feel than most of its competitors and had an effective build from a relatively quiet verse into a rousing chorus, allowing Ebstein to show her vocal range. At the close of voting, under the new system being trialled for the first time in the 1971 contest, "Diese Welt" had received 100 points, placing Germany third of the 18 entries, matching Ebstein's placing in 1970, at the time Germany's highest Eurovision finish.

Voting

References 

1971
Countries in the Eurovision Song Contest 1971
Eurovision